Arthur W Saunders (1913 - date of death unknown), was a South African international lawn bowler.

Bowls career
He won a bronze medal in the singles at the 1954 British Empire and Commonwealth Games in Vancouver.

He won the 1953 singles at the National Championships bowling for the East London Railway Bowls Club.

Personal life
He was a company manager by trade.

References

1913 births
Date of death unknown
Bowls players at the 1954 British Empire and Commonwealth Games
South African male bowls players
Commonwealth Games bronze medallists for South Africa
Commonwealth Games medallists in lawn bowls
Medallists at the 1954 British Empire and Commonwealth Games